Thousand Ships Bay is a bay located on the south coast of Santa Isabel Island in the Solomon Islands, between San Jorge Island and Santa Isabel Island.

References
 
 Tideschart.com tide table of Thousand Ships Bay
 Tide-Forecast.com tide table of Thousand Ships Bay
 Hammond World Travel Atlas''. Union, N.J.: Hammond World Atlas Corporation, c. 2004–2005. . Page 245.
 

Bays of the Solomon Islands